Psalidognathus friendi is a species of beetle belonging to the family Cerambycidae.

Description
The surfaceof the elytra may be metallic brown, green or bluish. The head and the prothorax are spiny and the mandibles are very large.

Distribution
This species can be found in Colombia, Venezuela, Peru, Ecuador and Bolivia.

References

Prioninae
Beetles described in 1831
Taxa named by George Robert Gray